The 2013–14 Österreichische Basketball Bundesliga or Admiral Basketball Bundesliga, was the 68th season of the Österreichische Basketball Bundesliga. 11 teams participated this season.

UBC magnofit Güssing Knights won their first Bundesliga title in history, by beating ece Bulls Kapfenberg 3–2 in the Finals, despite not having home court advantage.

Teams

Standings

Overall standings

|}

Playoffs

Statistical leaders

Points

Rebounds

Assists

Awards
Most Valuable Player
 Mark Sanchez (ece Bulls Kapfenberg)
Austrian MVP
 Martin Kohlmaier (ece Bulls Kapfenberg)
Finals MVP
 Anthony Shavies (UBC magnofit Güssing Knights)
Coach of the Year
 Matthias Zollner (UBC magnofit Güssing Knights)

References

Österreichische Basketball Bundesliga seasons
Austrian
Lea